The grey nightjar or gray nightjar (Caprimulgus jotaka) is a species of nightjar found in East Asia. It is sometimes treated as a subspecies of the jungle nightjar (C. indicus), its South Asian relative.

References

nightjar, grey
Birds of East Asia
Birds described in 1845
Taxa named by Hermann Schlegel
Taxa named by Coenraad Jacob Temminck